Belonging is a 1922 British silent crime film directed by Floyd Martin Thornton and starring Hugh Buckler, Barbara Hoffe and William Lenders. The film's direction is sometimes alternatively credited to George Ridgwell.

Cast
 Hugh Buckler as Charles Carton  
 Barbara Hoffe as Sara Lansdale  
 William Lenders as Count Desanges  
 Cecil Barry as Julian Guise  
 George Garvey as Dominique Guise 
 Leo Pinto as Anatole Colin 
 Winifred Harris as Lady Diana

References

Bibliography
 Goble, Alan. The Complete Index to Literary Sources in Film. Walter de Gruyter, 1999.

External links
 

1922 films
1922 crime films
British crime films
British silent feature films
1920s English-language films
Films directed by Floyd Martin Thornton
Films set in England
Stoll Pictures films
British black-and-white films
1920s British films